Alluri Venkata Sathyanarayana Raju (born 18 April 1937), familiarly known as AVS Raju works in the Indian construction industry and is the founder chairman of Nagarjuna Construction Company Ltd.

Early life 
AVS Raju was born on 18 April 1937 and hails from a family that has been in the construction for over three generations. He left his village Antervedipalem in East Godavari District, Andhra Pradesh, India, after matriculation at the age of 18 years to make his career in Hyderabad and started contributing his share in developing the state in the areas of Industry, Infrastructure, Agriculture and Power.
For the last 45 years of his career, he has contributed in promoting many industries around Hyderabad and various parts of Andhra Pradesh while spreading the Construction activity in the country. 

He was the Secretary and Treasurer of Sri Nagarjuna Cooperative Housing Society Limited in 1975 and presently is its President.

He was one of the promoters of M/s Nagarjuna Steels Ltd., during 1975-76, the first company of the present popular Nagarjuna group of Companies in Hyderabad. He was also one of the promoters of Deccan Cements Ltd., during 1983-84 which was the first mini-cement plant in the country.

He was also Promoter and Managing Director of M/s AVS Containers Ltd. in 1983-84.

Literature 
Raju enjoys writing. He was member of many social and literary associations in Andhra Pradesh. He wrote more than 10,000 poems on various subjects including his two well-known books one on Sri Rama entitled Rama Rasamrutham and another one is on Bhagawan Sri Sri Sri Sathya Sai Baba entitled Sri Sai Sudha Madhuri.

He has received UGADI PURASKAR from Govt. of Andhra Pradesh, India in 1998.

AVS Raju has set a new Guinness world record by writing the largest single-volume biography Sri Sai Sudha Madhuri on the life of Sri Satya Sai Baba between 1996 and 2007. The single bound book consists of 32 separate volumes.

Raju has recently been appointed as chairman of the Hyderabad District Dharmic Council. He was also conferred with an honorary doctorate by the Acharya Nagarjuna University in 2008.

He has been mentioned in the Limca Book of World Records for four consecutive years (2005–08).

Social service and other achievements 

 He had undertaken social forestry with a target of planting 2 lakh trees on large scale as a protagonist of environmental protection and preservation of ecological balance and achieved the goal.
 Chairman for a Unique Venture "Galaxy of Prominent Telugus 1st World Conference-1995" which was successfully organised on 30.12.1995 and 31.12.1995 at Sri Sathya Sai Nigamagam, Hyderabad and documented the achievements of 1000 distinguished personalities of World Telugus Origin, in varied fields.
 He was awarded "Life Time Achievement award" instituted by the Builders' Association of India. The Union Minister for Overseas Indian Affairs, Vayalar Ravi, presented the award to AVS Raju at a function held in Kochi in 2006.
 He was awarded Padma Shri by the Government of India in 2010 in the field of Trade and Industry.

References 

People from East Godavari district
Living people
1937 births
Recipients of the Padma Shri in trade and industry
Businesspeople from Andhra Pradesh
Acharya Nagarjuna University alumni